WorldFish is an international nonprofit research institution that creates and translates scientific research on aquatic food systems. 

WorldFish is a member of CGIAR, which unites international organizations engaged in research about food security.

Based in Penang, Malaysia, the company has a presence in 20 countries throughout Africa, Asia and the Pacific Region.

WorldFish has introduced technologies to ramp up local aquatic food production through a network of partners. Such innovations include the development of "Genetically Improved Farmed Tilapia" (GIFT) and an enhanced strain of Nile tilapia, in support of smallhold aquaculture farmers in the Global South.

WorldFish research
In 2020, WorldFish began to transition from fisheries and aquaculture to a more holistic aquatic foods system approach. The institution shifted towards food systems management to focus on aquatic food value chains from production through consumption, with focuses on climate resilience and environmental sustainability.

Recognition 
WorldFish has been recognized for its work in Nile tilapia. WorldFish fisheries scientist Modadugu Vijay Gupta was awarded the World Food Prize for his research on genetically improved farmed tilapia (GIFT) in support of food and nutrition security in food-insecure regions. 

Shakuntala Haraksingh Thilsted, a food nutritionist with WorldFish, received the 2021 World Food Prize for her groundbreaking research, critical insights, and landmark innovations in developing holistic, nutrition-sensitive approaches to aquaculture and food systems.

Impact
WorldFish has worked to breed genetically enhanced fast-growing tilapia (GIFT) varieties to raise the productivity and incomes of low-income smallholder farmers. It also works to improve the production of key inputs for aquaculture, specifically fish feed and fingerlings, and links small-scale aquatic food producers with input and output markets.

References

External links
 

International research institutes
Research institutes in Malaysia
Fisheries and aquaculture research institutes
Research institutes established in 1975
Fisheries conservation organizations
Environmental organisations based in Malaysia